Ripak-e Pirandad (also Romanized as Rīpak-e Pīrāndād; also known as Pīrāndād Bāzār) is a village in Negur Rural District, Dashtiari District, Chabahar County, Sistan and Baluchestan Province, Iran. At the 2006 census, its population was 109, in 23 families.

References 

Populated places in Chabahar County